Dawlat Ahmadzai (born September 5, 1984) is a right-handed batsman and right arm fast-medium bowler who plays for Afghanistan.

After the Afghan team secured One Day International status by securing a top-six finish at the 2009 ICC World Cup Qualifier in South Africa (although not qualifying for the 2011 Cricket World Cup itself), on April 19, 2009 he took the first ever wicket for Afghanistan in an ODI when he dismissed Scotland's Gavin Hamilton as the Afghan team won the Qualifier's fifth-place play-off at Willowmoore Park, Benoni.

References

External links
Cricinfo page on Dawlat Ahmadzai
Dawlat Ahmadzai on CricketArchive

1984 births
Living people
Afghan cricketers
Pashtun people
Afghanistan One Day International cricketers
Afghanistan Twenty20 International cricketers
People from Logar Province
Afghan cricket coaches